Helcystogramma subvectella is a moth in the family Gelechiidae. It was described by Francis Walker in 1864. It is found in Amazonas, Brazil.

Adults are dark cupreous, the forewings with four chalybeous (steel-blue) bands, the first near the base and the fourth near the exterior border.

References

Moths described in 1864
subvectella
Moths of South America